Tocantins Esporte Clube, commonly known as Tocantins, is a Brazilian football club based in Imperatriz, Maranhão state. They competed in the Série C once.

History
The club was founded on December 2, 1975. Tocantins won the Campeonato Maranhense Second Level in 2001. The club competed in the Série C in 2002, when they were eliminated in the First Stage of the competition.

Achievements

 Campeonato Maranhense Second Level:
 Winners (1): 2001

Stadium
Tocantins Esporte Clube play their home games at Estádio Frei Epifânio D'Abadia, nicknamed Abadião. The stadium has a maximum capacity of 12,000 people.

References

Association football clubs established in 1975
Football clubs in Maranhão
1975 establishments in Brazil